Stepping Up is a five-part drama shown on the CBBC Channel from 3 to 7 September 2012. It is a series of one-off dramas about children making the move from primary to secondary school. Music was composed and performed by Steve Wright, who also composed the music for Brookside, Damon and Debbie, Waterfront Beat, And The Beat Goes On, Hollyoaks, Courtroom, Moving On series 1–6, Justice, Secrets And Words and The Very Hungry Frenchman.

List of Stepping Up episodes

British children's drama television series
2010s British children's television series